A list of windmills in Haute-Garonne, France

External links
French windmills website

Windmills in France
Haute-Garonne
Buildings and structures in Haute-Garonne